The 2021 GT World Challenge Europe Sprint Cup Magny-Cours round was a motor racing event for the GT World Challenge Europe Sprint Cup, held on the weekend of 7 to 9 May 2021. The event was held on the Circuit de Nevers Magny-Cours in Magny-Cours, Bourgogne-Franche-Comté, France and consisted of two races, both one hour in length. It was the first event in the 2021 GT World Challenge Europe Sprint Cup and hosted Races 1 and 2 of the season.

Results

Race 1

Qualifying

Race

Race 2

Qualifying

Race

References

External links
Official website
Race 1 replay
Race 2 replay

|- style="text-align:center"
|width="35%"|Previous race:
|width="30%"|GT World Challenge Europe Sprint Cup2021 season
|width="40%"|Next race:

GT World Challenge Europe Sprint Cup Magny-Cours round
GT World Challenge Europe Sprint Cup Magny-Cours round